Acanthogammaridae is a family of amphipod crustaceans, endemic to Lake Baikal. It contains the following subfamilies and genera:

Acanthogammarinae Garjajeff, 1901
Acanthogammarus Stebbing, 1899
Boeckaxelia Schellenberg, 1940
Brachyuropus Stebbing, 1899
Brandtia Bate, 1862
Carinurus Sowinsky, 1915
Cheirogammarus Sowinsky, 1915
Coniurus Sowinsky, 1915
Cornugammarus Kamaltynov, 2001
Dedyuola Kamaltynov, 2001
Diplacanthus Kamaltynov, 2001
Dorogammarus Bazikalova, 1945
Dorogostaiskia Kamaltynov, 2001
Eucarinogammarus Sowinsky, 1915
Issykogammarus Chevreux, 1908
Metapallasea Bazikalova, 1959
Oxyacanthus Kamaltynov, 2001
Carinogammarinae Tachteew, 2000
Aspretus Kamaltynov, 2001
Asprogammarus Bazikalova, 1975
Carinogammarus Stebbing, 1899
Echiuropus Sowinsky, 1915
Eremogammarus Kamaltynov, 2001
Pseudomicruropus Bazikalova, 1961
Smaragdogammarus Bazikalova, 1975
Hyalellopsinae Kamaltynov, 1999
Gammarosphaera Bazikalova, 1936
Hyalellopsis Stebbing, 1899
Parapallaseinae Kamaltynov, 1999
Ceratogammarus Sowinsky, 1915
Palicarcinus Barnard & Barnard, 1983
Parapallasea Stebbing, 1899
Plesiogammarinae Kamaltynov, 1999
Garjajewia Sowinsky, 1915
Koshovia Bazikalova, 1975
Paragarjajewia Bazikalova, 1945
Plesiogammarus Stebbing, 1899
Sentogammarus Kamaltynov, 2001
Supernogammarus Kamaltynov, 2001
Poekilogammarinae Kamaltynov, 1999
Bathygammarus Bazikalova, 1945
Gymnogammarus Sowinsky, 1915
Inobsequentus Takhteev, 2000
Nyctoporea Kamaltynov, 2001
Onychogammarus Sowinsky, 1915
Poekilogammarus Stebbing, 1899
Rostrogammarus Bazikalova, 1945

References

External links

Gammaridea
Freshwater crustaceans of Asia
Crustacean families